Myles Wilder (January 28, 1933 – April 20, 2010) was a television comedy writer and producer.

Wilder attended and graduated from UCLA's Theater Arts Department. During his senior year, he and two of his friends, Mitch Rose and Wayne Thoms, produced a documentary entitled "The Sports Car" that depicted the history of and interest in sports cars. He started writing in Hollywood in 1952 with Rebound. He wrote seven screenplays for film, with six of them being directed by his father W. Lee Wilder (1904–1982), the older brother of famous director Billy Wilder. Myles would write for a variety of shows over the next two decades, such as McHale's Navy, Korg: 70,000 B.C., and The Dukes of Hazzard. He also served as a script consultant on the television series Karen, producer of Hazzard and McDuff, the Talking Dog, and executive story consultant on programs like Hazzard, Hong Kong Phooey, and Devlin

Filmography
Films written
 Phantom from Space (1953)
 Killers from Space (1954)
 The Snow Creature (1954)
 Fright (1956)
 Manfish (1956) 
 Seven Guns to Mesa (1958)
Spy in the Sky! (1958)

Television written
 Rebound (1952)
 Wagon Train (1960, 1961, 1963)
 Bluebeard's Ten Honeymoons (1960)
 Bonanza (1960)
 My Three Sons (1961, 1967)
 Bachelor Father (1961-1962)
 The Aquanauts (1961)
 The Real McCoys (1961)
 McHale's Navy (1963-1966)
 I'm Dickens, He's Fenster (1963)
 Karen (1964-1965)
 Broadside (1964-1965)
 Hank (1965)
 The Patty Duke Show (1965-1966)
 Tammy (1965)
 Vacation Playhouse (1965)
 Laredo (1966)
 Mona McCluskey (1966)
 Run, Buddy, Run (1966)
 The 38th Annual Academy Awards (1966)
 Gomer Pyle, U.S.M.C. (1967-1968)
 Get Smart (1967-1968)
 Mr. Terrific (1967)
 The Magical World of Disney (1969)
 The Doris Day Show (1969, 1972-1973)
 The Flying Nun (1969)
 The Ghost & Mrs. Muir (1969)
 The Tim Conway Comedy Hour (1970)
 The Brady Bunch (1970, 1972-1973) 
 Here's Lucy (1970)
 The Tim Conway Show (1970)
 The Good Life (1971)
 The Paul Lynde Show (1972-1973)
 The Roman Holidays (1972)
 Wait Till Your Father Gets Home (1972)
 Butch Cassidy (1973)
 Inch High, Private Eye (1973)
 The Addams Family (1973)
 Temperatures Rising (1973)
 Korg: 70,000 B.C. (1974; creative consultant)
 Hong Kong Phooey (1974)
 Devlin (1974)
 Welcome Back, Kotter (1975, 1977)
 When Things Were Rotten (1975)
 McDuff, the Talking Dog (1976, also creator)
 Good Heavens (1976)
 The San Pedro Beach Bums (1977)
 C.P.O. Sharkey (1978)
 Diff'rent Strokes (1978)
 The Dukes of Hazzard (1979-1985)

References

External links
 

1933 births
2010 deaths
American television writers
American male television writers
American comedy writers
Deaths from digestive disease
UCLA Film School alumni